Elsinoë veneta is a plant pathogen, which is the causal agent of anthracnose of raspberry.

References

External links 

 
 USDA ARS Fungal Database
 
 

Elsinoë
Fungal plant pathogens and diseases
Small fruit diseases
Fungi described in 1887
Raspberry diseases